James Larry Edmondson (born July 14, 1947) is a Senior United States circuit judge of the United States Court of Appeals for the Eleventh Circuit.

Education and early career

Born in Jasper, Georgia, Edmondson received a Bachelor of Arts degree from Emory University in 1968, a Juris Doctor from the University of Georgia School of Law in 1971, and a Master of Laws in Judicial Process from the University of Virginia School of Law in 1990.

Edmondson clerked for Judge Sidney Oslin Smith Jr. of the United States District Court for the Northern District of Georgia from 1971 to 1973. He was an attorney in private practice in Jasper during 1973, and in Lawrenceville, Georgia from 1973 to 1986. Edmondson also taught as a law professor at the University of Georgia from 1975 to 1984.

Federal judicial service

On March 26, 1986, Edmondson was nominated by President Ronald Reagan to a seat on the United States Court of Appeals for the Eleventh Circuit. vacated by Judge Albert John Henderson. Edmondson was confirmed by the United States Senate on April 29, 1986, and received his commission on May 7, 1986. He served as Chief Judge from 2002 to 2009. Edmondson assumed senior status on July 15, 2012.

Notable case

In 2000, Edmondson, as part of a 3-judge panel with Judges Joel Fredrick Dubina and Charles R. Wilson, issued the opinion that ultimately led to Elian Gonzalez being sent back to Cuba to be reunited with his father.

References

Sources
 

1947 births
20th-century American judges
Emory University alumni
Georgia (U.S. state) lawyers
Judges of the United States Court of Appeals for the Eleventh Circuit
Living people
People from Jasper, Georgia
United States court of appeals judges appointed by Ronald Reagan
University of Georgia alumni
University of Virginia School of Law alumni